Ryan Thacher (born 6 October 1989) is an American tennis player. Thacher played in his first national tennis tournament when he was 14.

Thacher has a career high ATP singles ranking of 974 achieved on 25 February 2013. He also has a career high ATP doubles ranking of 528 achieved on 22 July 2013.

Thacher made his ATP main draw debut at the 2007 Countrywide Classic in the doubles draw partnering Zack Fleishman.

References

External links

1989 births
Living people
American male tennis players
Tennis players from Los Angeles